Otradnoye is a station of the Serpukhovsko-Timiryazevskaya Line of the Moscow Metro. It was opened in 1991, being the last Metro station opened in Soviet Union, and built to a single-vault technology. The station contains several mosaic artworks.

Moscow Metro stations
Railway stations in Russia opened in 1992
Serpukhovsko-Timiryazevskaya Line
Railway stations located underground in Russia